Patronato may refer to:

Club Atlético Patronato, an Argentine football club
Patronato real, an arrangement between the Vatican and the Kingdom of Spain
Barrio Patronato, a barrio (district) in Santiago, Chile
Patronato metro station of Santiago Metro
Patronato, Santa Maria, a district in Santa Maria, Rio Grande do Sul, Brazil